Admire is a city in Lyon County, Kansas, United States.  As of the 2020 census, the population of the city was 130.

History
Admire was founded in 1886. It was named for one of its founders, Jacob Admire.

The first post office in Admire was established in November 1886.

Admire was a station and shipping point on the Missouri Pacific Railroad. By the mid 1990s, rail service in Admire had been discontinued, and the tracks are now being used as a rail trail.

Admire's current acting mayor is Robert Reust. The former mayor, prior to January 2022, was Michael Spade, a local farmer.

Geography
Admire is located at  (38.641416, -96.101932).

Demographics

Admire is part of the Emporia Micropolitan Statistical Area.

2010 census
As of the census of 2010, there were 156 people, 60 households, and 43 families living in the city. The racial makeup of the city was 95.5% White, 0.6% from other races, and 3.8% from two or more races. Hispanic or Latino of any race were 7.1% of the population.

There were 60 households, of which 33.3% had children under the age of 18 living with them, 60.0% were married couples living together, 8.3% had a female householder with no husband present, 3.3% had a male householder with no wife present, and 28.3% were non-families. 28.3% of all households were made up of individuals, and 15% had someone living alone who was 65 years of age or older. The average household size was 2.60 and the average family size was 3.16.

The median age in the city was 32.5 years. 26.3% of residents were under the age of 18; 9% were between the ages of 18 and 24; 23.1% were from 25 to 44; 25.7% were from 45 to 64; and 16% were 65 years of age or older. The gender makeup of the city was 47.4% male and 52.6% female.

2000 census
As of the census of 2000, there were 177 people, 67 households, and 47 families living in the city. The racial makeup of the city was 95.48% White, 0.56% Native American, 0.56% from other races, and 3.39% from two or more races. 1.13% of the population were Hispanic or Latino of any race.

There were 67 households, out of which 37.3% had children under the age of 18 living with them, 62.7% were married couples living together, 6.0% had a female householder with no husband present, and 28.4% were non-families. 26.9% of all households were made up of individuals, and 11.9% had someone living alone who was 65 years of age or older. The average household size was 2.64 and the average family size was 3.17.

In the city, the population was spread out, with 28.2% under the age of 18, 11.3% from 18 to 24, 29.4% from 25 to 44, 20.9% from 45 to 64, and 10.2% who were 65 years of age or older. The median age was 34 years. For every 100 females, there were 90.3 males. For every 100 females age 18 and over, there were 92.4 males.

The median income for a household in the city was $40,250, and the median income for a family was $47,250. Males had a median income of $26,406 versus $18,750 for females. The per capita income for the city was $15,666. About 3.9% of families and 4.4% of the population were below the poverty line, including 4.9% of those under the age of eighteen and none of those 65 or over.

Education
The community is served by North Lyon County USD 251 public school district.

Transportation

Notable person
 Alvin M. Johnston, test pilot

References

Further reading

External links
 City of Admire
 Admire - Directory of Public Officials
 Admire city map, KDOT

Cities in Kansas
Cities in Lyon County, Kansas
Emporia, Kansas micropolitan area
1886 establishments in Kansas
Populated places established in 1886